Los Artistas Segunda Etapa is a community located in Nuevo Laredo Municipality in the Mexican state of Tamaulipas.  According to the INEGI Census of 2010, Los Artistas has a population of 54 inhabitants. Its elevation is 164 meters above sea level.

References 

Populated places in Tamaulipas
Laredo–Nuevo Laredo